James Harold Savage (August 29, 1883 – June 26, 1940) was a Major League Baseball outfielder. He played two games in 1912 for the Philadelphia Phillies, then spent  playing regularly for the Pittsburgh Rebels in the Federal League. He played mostly in right field, where he played 66 games, but also played substantially in left field and at shortstop and third base. He played another 14 games for the Rebels in 1915 to finish his major league career.

Sources

References

 http://www.thebaseballcube.com/players/profile.asp?ID=17592

Major League Baseball outfielders
Philadelphia Phillies players
Pittsburgh Rebels players
Utica Utes players
Baseball players from Connecticut
1883 births
1940 deaths
People from Southington, Connecticut
Wellsville Rainmakers players